Keean Johnson (born c. 1996/1997) is an American actor.

Born in Colorado, he played one of the lead roles, Hugo, in the film Alita: Battle Angel. On television, he has starred as Adam Freeman on the show Spooksville, and Colt Wheeler on Nashville, as well as having recurring roles on The Fosters and Guidance.

Filmography

Film

Television

Awards and nominations

References

External links

21st-century American male actors
American male film actors
American male television actors
Dancers from Colorado
Living people
Male actors from Colorado
Year of birth missing (living people)